The Aksaray Grand Mosque, also known as the Ulu Mosque, is the mosque located in the city center of Aksaray. It is also known as the Karamanoğlu Mosque. It was commissioned by Mehmet I of Karaman and built between 1408-1409.

History
The Aksaray Grand Mosque was built by the Anatolian Seljuks in 1408-1409 and commissioned by Mehmet I of Karaman.

Gallery

References

Sources
    Investıgatıon of Archıtectural of Aksaray Grand Mosque and Structural Deterıoratıon Factors
 
 
 District governor's official website

External links

 Information about Aksaray Grand Mosque
 Picture gallery of the mosque

1408 establishments
Aksaray
Mosques in Turkey